The Aliabad Tower is a historical tower dating to the 14th century. It is located in Aliabad-e Keshmar, near the town of Bardaskan in the Iranian province of Razavi Khorasan. The cone-shaped facade is made of brick. The design is reminiscent of the Dakhma of Zoroastrianism. The tower was added to the list of National Monuments of Iran.

Gallery

See also
 Firuzabad Tower
 Seyed Bagher Ab anbar
 Abdolabad Tomb
 Gonbad-e Qabus (tower)
 Aladdin Tower

Notes

Towers completed in the 14th century
Buildings and structures in Bardaskan
Towers in Iran
National works of Iran
Tourist attractions in Razavi Khorasan Province